Clas Bjerkander (23 September 1735, Skara – 1 August 1795) was a Swedish meteorologist, botanist, and entomologist.

A Lutheran pastor, Bjerkander studied at the University of Uppsala.

With Anders Dahl he wrote Svenska Topographiska Sällskapet i Skara ("Schwedische topographische Gesellschaft zu Skara") and, as sole author several short scientific papers on Microlepidoptera.

Taxa named for him include

Pyralis bjerkandriana (Mehlmotte)
Bjerkandera P. Karst

In 1778, Bjerkander was elected a member of the Royal Swedish Academy of Sciences.

References
Heinrich Dörfelt, Heike Heklau: Die Geschichte der Mykologie. 1998

External links 
Animalbase Taxa described by Bjerkandar and list of papers.

1735 births
1795 deaths
Swedish botanists
Swedish entomologists
Swedish lepidopterists
Members of the Royal Swedish Academy of Sciences